Gan Wei (born 21 May 1984), also known as Vivian Gan, is a Chinese actress and the founder of LeYoung Pictures which produced the hit web series Go Princess Go (2015). Gan has had supporting roles in multiple films, but is perhaps better known as the wife of billionaire Jia Yueting.

In 2017, after Jia Yueting was put on China's debt blacklist, he refused to return to China despite a court order. Gan Wei and Jia's brother were tasked to settle his debts.

In early 2018, Gan Wei was put onto the list of defaulters by Beijing No.3 Intermediate People’s Court, which made her subject to travel restrictions.

Filmography

Film

Web series

References

External links

21st-century Chinese actresses
1984 births
Living people
Chinese film actresses
Actresses from Chongqing
People's Liberation Army Academy of Art alumni